This Week of Grace is a 1933 British comedy film directed by Maurice Elvey and starring Gracie Fields, Henry Kendall and John Stuart. The screenplay concerns a poor, unemployed woman who is made housekeeper at the estate of a wealthy duchess. It was promoted with the tagline "Cinderella in modern dress". It includes  songs written by Harry Parr-Davies, including "My Lucky Day" and "Happy Ending".

Plot
Grace Milroy loses her job working at a factory. However, through a strange set of circumstances, she is taken on as housekeeper at the nearby Swinford Castle the home of the eccentric Duchess of Swinford. She is initially coldly received by the other staff but she soon wins them over with her personality and hard work. While working there she falls in love with the Duchess' nephew, Viscount Swinford and eventually marries him. Later when she wrongly believes him to have married her under the mistaken impression she is rich she leaves him and goes to take a job on the stage working in the chorus line. Eventually the misunderstanding is cleared up and the couple reconcile.

Cast
 Gracie Fields as Grace Milroy
 Henry Kendall as Lord Clive Swinford
 John Stuart as Henry Baring
 Frank Pettingell as Mr Milroy
 Minnie Rayner as Mrs Milroy
 Douglas Wakefield as Joe Milroy
 Vivian Foster as Vicar
 Marjorie Brooks as Pearl Forrester
 Helen Haye as Lady Warmington
 Nina Boucicault as Duchess of Swinford
 Sherman Fisher Girls as Dancers

Production
The film was made by Twickenham Studios following a dispute between Radio Pictures, who owned the rights to Fields, and Associated Talking Pictures (ATP) who had previously made her films. It was part of an attempt by Twickenham to move away from making Quota quickies towards higher budgeted quality productions a strategy that continued until the bankruptcy of its owner Julius Hagen. As the sound stage at Twickenham was already booked, the film was shot at Ealing Studios.

Reception
The film is one of the least well-known of Fields' work. It has been noted for its promotion of a national consensus between classes - the first time this had been featured in a Fields film. It was theme which was to become a cornerstone of her work during her years of mainstream popularity. It was well-received on its release with Kine Weekly observing that the film consolidated Field's as "England's premier entertainer".

Preservation status
Thought to have been lost, it was loaned to the British Film Institute as a result of its 2010 search for missing films, and a copy was made for the National Archive.

References

Bibliography
 Richards, Jeffrey. The Age of the Dream Palace. Routledge & Kegan, 1984.
 Richards, Jeffrey (ed.). The Unknown 1930s: An Alternative History of the British Cinema, 1929- 1939. I.B. Tauris & Co, 1998.
 Shafer, Stephen C. British popular films, 1929-1939: The Cinema of Reassurance. Routledge, 1997.

External links

1933 films
1933 comedy films
1930s English-language films
Films directed by Maurice Elvey
1930s rediscovered films
British comedy films
Films set in London
Ealing Studios films
British black-and-white films
Rediscovered British films
Films scored by Percival Mackey
1930s British films